Yuliia Shuliar (born 12 August 1997) is a Ukrainian Paralympic athlete who competes in T20 category 400 metres races. She represented the Ukraine at the 2020 Summer Paralympics.

Career
Shuliar represented Ukraine in the 400 metres T20 event at the 2020 Summer Paralympics and won a silver medal.

References

1997 births
Living people
Sportspeople from Zhytomyr
Paralympic athletes of Ukraine
Medalists at the World Para Athletics Championships
Medalists at the World Para Athletics European Championships
Athletes (track and field) at the 2020 Summer Paralympics
Medalists at the 2020 Summer Paralympics
Paralympic medalists in athletics (track and field)
Paralympic silver medalists for Ukraine
Ukrainian female sprinters